The 1959 United Nations Security Council election was held between 12 October and 12 December during the fourteenth session of the United Nations General Assembly, held at United Nations Headquarters in New York City. The General Assembly elected three members through consultation of the president, as non-permanent members of the UN Security Council for two-year mandates commencing on 1 January 1960.

Rules 
The Security Council had 11 seats, filled by five permanent members and six non-permanent members before 1967. Each year, half of the non-permanent members were elected for two-year terms. A sitting member may not immediately run for re-election.

Result 
At this time, the United Nations had 81 member states (for a timeline of UN membership, see Enlargement of the United Nations). There were five candidacies for three seats. At the meeting on 12 October 1959, the President of the United Nations General Assembly proposed granting seats to Ecuador, and Ceylon, a motion that was approved by the assembly. Further discussion of the candidacies of Turkey and Poland was moved to another day.

Day 1
The first thirteen rounds of balloting were held on 12 October 1959 at the 825th plenary meeting of the General Assembly. Ecuador, and Ceylon were elected in the first round, leaving only the WOEG seat vacant. As Poland and Turkey were the states with the highest number of votes contesting the Asian seat, in accordance with the rules, consecutive rounds of restricted voting would commence. In these rounds, only the two states that have attained the highest number of votes in the previous round (Poland and Turkey) could be voted on, any other votes would be considered invalid. After the thirteen rounds of voting failed to provide an election outcome, the meeting rose.

Day 2
The next twelve rounds of balloting were held on 13 October 1959 at the 826th plenary meeting of the General Assembly.

Day 3
The next six rounds of balloting were held on 19 October 1959 at the 827th plenary meeting of the General Assembly.

Day 4
The next six rounds of balloting were held on 3 November 1959 at the 830th plenary meeting of the General Assembly.

Day 5
The next six rounds of balloting were held on 17 November 1959 at the 835th plenary meeting of the General Assembly.

Day 6
The next six rounds of balloting were held on 1 December 1959 at the 839th plenary meeting of the General Assembly.

Day 7
The final round of balloting was held on 12 December 1959 at the 845th plenary meeting of the General Assembly. During this round, the General Assembly was able to endorse an agreement. President stated that “Poland will at this time be the only candidate for election as non-permanent member of the Security Council and, if elected, will serve in that capacity during the year 1960. As an integral part of the agreement reached, Poland will withdraw from the Council on 31 December 1960. This would mean that… Turkey would be the only candidate to fill the vacancy thus created on the Council and to serve as non-permanent member during the year 1961.” Therefore, Polan received 71 votes.

See also 

 List of members of the United Nations Security Council
 Turkey and the United Nations
 Poland and the United Nations
 Ecuador and the United Nations

References

Sources

External links 

 UN Document A/59/881 Note Verbale from the Permanent Mission of Costa Rica containing a record of Security Council elections up to 2004

1959 elections
1959
Non-partisan elections
1959 in international relations
Security Council election